Why Am I Treated So Bad! is an album by the Cannonball Adderley Quintet, recorded at the Capitol Studios in Hollywood in 1967.

The song "I'm on My Way", was written by his nephew Nat Adderley Jr., who at the time was an 11-year-old living in Teaneck, New Jersey.

Track listing 
(CD re-issue)

 "Introduction" – 0:13
 "Mini Mama" (Curtis Fuller) – 6:41
 "I'm on My Way" (Nat Adderley Jr.) – 7:49
 "Why Am I Treated So Bad" (Roebuck Staples) - 7:47
 "One for Newk" (Josef Zawinul) – 5:15
 "Yvette" (Josef Zawinul) – 2:21
 "The Other Side" (Nat Adderley)  – 9:04
 "The Scene" (Josef Zawinul) – 2:39
 "Heads Up! Feet Down!" (Jimmy Heath) – 7:00
 "The Girl Next Door" (Hugh Martin, Ralph Blane) – 12:07

Personnel 
Julian "Cannonball" Adderley – alto sax
Nat Adderley – cornet
Joe Zawinul – piano
Victor Gaskin – bass
Roy McCurdy – drums

References 

1967 live albums
Capitol Records live albums
Cannonball Adderley live albums
Albums produced by Cannonball Adderley
Albums recorded at Capitol Studios